DOS is second solo concert by Filipino actor and singer Daniel Padilla, in served as his birthday party, and as support of his first full-length studio album, DJP. Held at the Smart Araneta Coliseum on April 30, 2014. The set list includes his songs from his album as well as another songs from featured artists

Concerts
Padilla held press conference for his concert on March 27, 2014. He revealed that the concept of this concert will be sexier than the first one.

Wearing a white shirt, a black biker jacket and a pair of denim pants, Padilla opened the show with his hit song “Nasa Iyo Na Ang Lahat,” from the double platinum-selling album, “DJP.” Padilla continued with “Yugyugan Na,” Michael Buble’s “Everything,” Rivermaya’s “Liwanag sa Dilim” (with Khalil Ramos) and The Beatles’ “Something.” As in his previous concert, Daniel performed a set of mostly old songs—Otis Redding’s “Hard to Handle,” The Police’s “Every Breath You Take” (with Toni Gonzaga) and “I Got You (I Feel Good)” Daniel also sang “In My Life” with his mother, Karla Estrada. Even not made into the guest list, Vice Ganda came up to the stage asked by Padilla's mom Karla. He was cheered on with screams of approval as he played bass for his group Parking 5, which dished out the Juan de la Cruz Band’s “Titser’s Enemy No. 1.” And in what turned out to be a highlight of the show, he shared the spotlight with one of his idols, rock star Rico Blanco, in “Umaaraw, Umuulan”, “Awit ng Kabataan”. Allan Policarpio of Philippine Daily Inquirer praised Padilla renditions of “The Way You Look Tonight” and “It Might Be You” as he wrote  "To be fair, Daniel did surprisingly pleasant renditions..". Padilla serenading Bernardo with “Put Your Head on My Shoulder,” and did slow dance. Padilla and Bernardo sang “Got to Believe in Magic,” soundtrack of their popular TV series, “Got to Believe.”

His most applauded performances include his version of "It Might Be You," "Everything," and "Ligaya." The concert also featured Richard Yap, and Rio Brothers.

In media
This concert streamed live via Sky Cable’s pay per view services in Philippines.

Set list

Concert dates

Guests

Personnel
 Artists: Daniel Padilla 
 Concert organizer: ABS-CBN
 Concert promoter: Star Events

References

Daniel Padilla concert tours
2013 concerts